Aheda Zanetti (born 1967) is a Lebanese-born Australian fashion designer for Muslim women.

Zanetti was born in Tripoli, Lebanon, and moved with her family to Australia when she was two years old. Zanetti first designed the hijood (a portmanteau of hijab and hood) for Muslim girls to practice sports. In 2004, she launched a series of sportswear for Muslim women under the trademark Ahiida, and founded the company Ahiida Pty Ltd (AHIIDA). Under that brand, she has designed what she named the burqini (or burkini) (a portmanteau of burqa and bikini) for use by Muslim female swimmers. She estimates her sales at more than 700,000 garments since 2008. Burqini and Burkini are registered trademarks owned by Zanetti's company, though they have become generic terms for similar forms of Islamic swimwear.

References

External links
Burqini website

1967 births
Living people
People from Tripoli, Lebanon
Lebanese emigrants to Australia
Australian fashion designers
Australian women fashion designers
Lebanese fashion designers
Lebanese women fashion designers
Australian women company founders
Australian company founders
Australian Muslims
Muslim fashion designers